Pragersko (in older sources Pragarsko) is a small town in the Municipality of Slovenska Bistrica in northeastern Slovenia.

History
The former Austrian Southern Railway from Vienna to Ljubljana and Sežana runs through the settlement. It was only after the building of the Southern Railway in the mid-19th century that the town developed to its current size. The area is part of the traditional region of Styria. It is now included with the rest of the municipality in the Drava Statistical Region.

References

External links

Pragersko at Geopedia

Populated places in the Municipality of Slovenska Bistrica